Ortigosa de Cameros is a village, one of 174 municipalities of the province and autonomous community of La Rioja, Spain. Its name comes from the Latin word urtica, which in Spanish is ortiga, which is ' nettle ' in English. The title “de Cameros,” is shared with other nearby villages. It is one of the municipalities of Camero Neuvo, one of the 12 comarcas or regions of La Rioja. (The Comarcas of Spain article explains the comarcas.)
Its economic activity is based mainly on livestock, forestry, timber industry and rural tourism. Its patron saint is the Virgen del Carmen, whose feast is celebrated on July 16 .

Politics

Main sights

Religious buildings

 Parish church of St Martin
 Saint Michael church
 Saint Felix hermitage
 Saint Lucy hermitage
 Buen suceso parish church

Civil buildings

 "La Casa Grande"
 The iron bridge
 The concrete bridge

References

External links

 Ortigosa caves

Populated places in La Rioja (Spain)